Malthopsis gnoma is a marine fish, which is found at depth 90–475 m in the western central Atlantic, at the north coast of Cuba, near Puerto Rico and the Virgin Islands, and at the Caribbean coast of Central America.

References

Ogcocephalidae
Fish of the Caribbean
Fish described in 1998